Inti+Quila is the name utilized by the historic Chilean Nueva Canción groups Inti-Illimani and Quilapayún during their recent collaborative artistic efforts. These have included a Latin American and European tour, as well as the release of a CD and a DVD compilation of their joint concerts. The Inti+Quila denomination has been reserved for use by the Santiago, Chile-based "historic" factions of the groups.

Yet another conflict between the "historic" factions and the "new" lineups has erupted with the other Inti-Illimani and the Paris-based Quilapayún currently planning to tour Europe using the Inti+Quila name. In this particular case the term was clearly developed by the Chile-based historic members of both groups. The latter Inti+Quila are planning a Chilean tour in 2006, which could lead to mass confusion as both Inti+Quila collaborations will be performing at the same time. The groups remain extremely popular in both Latin America and Europe often playing to sold out shows wherever they go.

References

External links
Inti-Illimani (new faction) Official Site
Inti-Illimani (historic faction) Official Site
Quilapayún - Official Website (Spanish)

Chilean folk musical groups
Nueva canción musicians